Maru-a-Pula School is a co-educational, independent day and boarding secondary school in Gaborone, Botswana. It was founded in 1972.

The school prepares students for the Cambridge International General Certificate of Education (IGCSE), Advanced Subsidiary (AS) and Advanced (A) Level examinations. It is ranked the top secondary school in Botswana

References

External links

 

Educational institutions established in 1972
Secondary schools in Gaborone
International schools in Gaborone
Schools in Botswana